The Irish geographical name Ossory can refer to:
Kingdom of Ossory or Osraige, an ancient kingdom of Ireland
Earl of Ossory, a subsidiary title held by the Earl of Ormond
Ossory (UK Parliament constituency), a UK Parliament constituency in Ireland from 1885 to 1918
Diocese of Ossory, diocese associated with the ancient kingdom above, historical parent of the dioceses below
Roman Catholic Diocese of Ossory
Bishop of Ossory, bishop of the diocese above
Diocese of Ossory, Ferns and Leighlin, Church of Ireland, established 1835
Bishop of Ossory, Ferns and Leighlin, bishop of the diocese above 
Diocese of Cashel and Ossory, Church of Ireland, established 1977
Bishop of Cashel and Ossory, bishop of the diocese above 
Ronald Ossory Dunlop (1894–1973), Irish author and painter 
HMS Ossory, three ships of the Royal Navy
Ossory (horse), thoroughbred racehorse
Ossory, a fictional prophet in the novel Small Gods